Shirzad Peik Herfeh (born: February 22, 1980, Rasht, Iran) is an Iranian philosopher, author, translator and university professor at Imam Khomeini International University. He is best known for his Persian translation of Consequentialisim written by Julia Driver and On Adam Smith written by Jack Russell Weinstein, along with many articles in the field of philosophy, especially philosophy of morality, that he translated from English to Persian. He is also active as a manager in the Iranian Association of Philosophy and is a life member at the Institute for Research in Philosophy. Peik Herfeh taught philosophy as a faculty member in the philosophy department of the Imam Khomeini International University, Faculty of Humanities. Peik Herfeh also wrote a variety of articles on topics ranging from Iranian philosophy and Islamic philosophy to Western analytic and moral philosophy, in which he specializes. As an author, Peik Herfeh wrote two books in the fields of moral philosophy, Borders of Ethics and Utilitarianism, which were released in Iran in 2012 and 2015 respectively.

Early life and education
Shirzad Peik Herfeh was born on February 22, 1980, in Rasht, Northern Iran, and obtained his bachelor's degree in English language and literature from Shiraz University, his master's in philosophy in Imam Khomeini International University and his PhD in philosophy in 2010 from Allameh Tabataba'i University, Tehran, Iran.

He has worked as a lecturer in several universities in Tehran, including Allameh Tabataba'i University. He was also an interpreter at several bilingual philosophical conferences, such as "International Conference on Religious Epistemology", "International Conference on Mulla Sadra & Transcendent Philosophy" and "International Conference on Two Hundred Years after Kant." He has worked as a researcher, translator, and interpreter for Iranian philosophical institutes including Institute for Humanities and Cultural Studies, Iranian Institute of Philosophy, and Sadra Islamic Philosophy Institute. He is currently a faculty member and assistant professor of department of philosophy at Imam Khomeini International University (IKIU), Qazvin, Iran. He has published more than 20 books and research papers, including The Limits of Morality (Tehran, Ney, 2012), An Analysis and Critique of Classical and Modern Types of Utilitarianism (Tehran, Negah-e Mo’aser, 2015), and a Persian translation of Julia Driver’s Consequentialism (Tehran, Hekmat, 2015), and J. R. Weinstein’s On Adam Smith (Tehran, IHCS, 2013). His expertise, research interests, and publications (in Persian, English, and Russian) are focused in the areas of moral, political and legal philosophy; harm and liberty-limiting principles; comparative analysis between pre-Islamic Iranian teachings; Western philosophies and philosophers; comparative analysis between Islamic ethics and jurisprudence and Western moral philosophy; and comparative analysis between the main post-Islamic Iranian philosophical traditions – esp. The Peripatetic School, the Illumination School and Transcendent Philosophy – and Western philosophies and philosophers. He has taught students in these areas of expertise and has a particular interest in developing his theory entitled "the moral permissibility of subjective harm" for establishing peace and tolerance in the world – especially in the Middle East.
 
Peik Herfeh was a jury member and chairman of the ethics panel at the 2010 International Conference on World Philosophy Day. He is also a senior member at the International Economics Development Research Center (IEDRC), Kowloon, Hong Kong.

Academic works

Shirzad Peik Herfeh is an Iranian philosopher, intellectual, moral, political, and legal theorist, author, translator and university professor. He is best known for his theories for peace and tolerance in the world and in the Middle East, such as “The Moral Permissibility of Subjective Harms as a Base for Peace & Tolerance”, “A New Synthetic Model as a Refinement for the Do/Allow Distinction”, “An Appeal to Mysticism for Solving the Problem of Fanaticism”, “The Moral Limits of the Criminal Law”; and his own “Harm Principle” in which he criticizes J. S. Mill’s “Harm Principle”, analyzes different kinds of harm and categorizes them into two different categories: subjective & objective. He is also against “Legal Moralism” and “Legal Paternalism.”
Peik Herfeh is also known for introducing contemporary theories in moral, political, and legal philosophy to the Persian-speaking and Muslim world. He is also the manager of the Iranian Philosophers Association (IPA), in which he criticizes what he calls pop philosophy and open a third front for philosophy in Iran which differs both from that and from “academic philosophy". Peik Herfeh has also written a variety of articles from Iranian Zoroastrian pre-Islamic and post-Islamic thought to Western philosophy. 
His first Persian book entitled "The Borders of Ethics" (Persian: مرزهای اخلاق) has been the award winner of the 20th Book of the Season Award in Iran. It has been published in 2012 by Ney publication, the leading Iranian publisher in humanities and social sciences. His last Persian book entitled “The Origins and Different Types of Classical & Modern Utilitarianism” has been published by Nashr-e Negah-e Mo’aser. In this very book, he tries to find a reasonable answer for a variety of questions about utilitarianism, such as: 
  Are the values that should figure in determining which option is the best ‘the values of what would be the case were the agent to carry out the option’ or ‘the values that are possible for the agent in an ideal situation’?
  Is the moral quality of a feature of agency determined by ‘actual consequences’ or by what the agent ‘expects’ or ‘intends’ to be brought about by her actions?
  Is ‘the greatest good principle’ a criterion for evaluating ‘all features of agency’ or just agent’s ‘actions’? 
  Is the right action what ‘maximizes the good’ or what ‘satisfices the good’?
  Which one is the sole intrinsic good: ‘pleasure’ or ‘preference’?

Bibliography
Peik Herfeh, Shirzad. Borders of Ethics. Tehran: Ney Publication, 2012.
Weinstein, Jack Russel. On Adam Smith. Translated into Persian by Shirzad Peik Herfeh. Tehran: Institute of Humanities and Cultural Studies, 2013. 
Pek Herfeh, Shirzad. Utilitarianism. Tehran: Negah-e Moaser, 2015.
Driver, Julia. Conseqentialim. Translated into Persian by Shirzad Peik Herfeh. Tehran: Hekmat, 2015.

Journals
DOING/ALLOWING HARM DISTINCTION: A DESCRIPTION, ANALYSIS AND CRITIQUE OF ACCOUNTS OF DONAGAN, FOOT, QUINN AND BENNET
 THE DANGERS OF ALTRUISM: AN EXPLANATION AND ANALYSIS OF THE PRINCIPLE OF MAXIMIZATION OF THE GOOD IN NORMATIVE ETHICS AND JOHN RAWLS’S CRITICISMS ON IT

See also
Consequentialism
Utilitarianism
Intellectual Movements in Iran
Iranian philosophy
Moral philosophy

References

External links

Shirzad Peik Herfeh at Noormags (in Persian)

21st-century Iranian philosophers
Iranian democracy activists
Living people
1980 births
Academic staff of Imam Khomeini International University
Shiraz University alumni
Imam Khomeini International University alumni
Iranian political philosophers
Iranian ethicists